"Comparative Religion" is the twelfth episode of the first season of the American comedy television series Community. It aired in the United States on NBC on December 10, 2009.

Plot 
Shirley (Yvette Nicole Brown) plans a Christmas party for the study group, hoping to celebrate in her Christian ways, but learns everyone else is from a different religious background; Annie (Alison Brie) is Jewish, Abed (Danny Pudi) is Muslim, Troy (Donald Glover) is a Jehovah's Witness, Britta (Gillian Jacobs) is an atheist, Pierce (Chevy Chase) is in a cult but believes that it is a Buddhist community, while Jeff (Joel McHale) is agnostic. Meanwhile, Jeff stands up to a bully named Mike (Anthony Michael Hall) that harasses Abed in the cafeteria. Shirley insists that they refuse to support Jeff because she is against violence, but eventually the study group (even Shirley) comes to Jeff's defense when they fight Mike and his friends on the college campus. After they finish the fight bloodied and bruised but triumphant, the group celebrate the holidays and learn they all passed their Spanish final, meaning they will all move on to Spanish 102.

In the end tag, Abed piles Christmas decorations on Troy while singing "O Christmas Tree" with the lyrics "O Christmas Troy." Jeff walks in and asks why they do things like this, to which Troy replies that it's fun and Jeff helps decorate him.

Reception 
Around 5.505 million Americans watched "Comparative Religion".

Emily VanDerWerff of The A.V. Club rated the episode A, calling it "one of my favorite episodes of the show so far."

References

External links
 "Comparative Religion" at NBC.com
 

Community (season 1) episodes
2009 American television episodes
Television episodes about religion
Television episodes about bullying
American Christmas television episodes